Rabatat Rural District is in Kharanaq District of Ardakan County, Yazd province, Iran. At the National Census of 2006, its population was 2,329 in 712 households. There were 4,431 inhabitants in 658 households at the following census of 2011. At the most recent census of 2016, the population of the rural district was 4,113 in 737 households. The largest of its 144 villages was Robat-e Posht-e Badam, with 770 people.

References 

Ardakan County

Rural Districts of Yazd Province

Populated places in Yazd Province

Populated places in Ardakan County